Rachel Moulden, better known as Maiday (stylized as MΔîDΔY), is an English singer-songwriter from Worcestershire, now living in Bow, East London.

Biography
Maiday has written for a number of other artists including Wretch 32, Leona Lewis, Girls Aloud and Josh Kumra. She co-wrote and produced the UK number one single "Don't Go" for Wretch 32 and her vocals have been featured on a number of international hits including "Fade" by Jakwob that became a top 40 hit on the UK Singles Chart and on "Skydive" by Chuckie, a dance hit that has charted on European mainstream charts, notably in Belgium, France and Denmark. She has also featured on "One Way", a collaboration with Naughty Boy featuring Mic Righteous on Naughty Boy's 2013 album Hotel Cabana.

Discography

As lead artist

As featured artist

Other appearances

Production credits

References

External links
Facebook

Year of birth missing (living people)
English women singers
English songwriters
Living people
Musicians from Worcestershire